HMVS Childers was a torpedo boat of the Victorian Naval Forces, Commonwealth Naval Forces and the Royal Australian Navy.

Construction and acquisition
Childers, a first-class torpedo boat, was constructed for the colony of Victoria by Thornycroft of Chiswick, England at a cost of £10,500. She was laid down in 1883, and completed by the start of 1884.

Operational history
HMVS Childers sailed from Portsmouth on 3 February 1884. Later that month, she was in Malta on her delivery voyage to Victoria with HMVS Albert and HMVS Victoria when news of General Gordon's death at Khartoum arrived. The colony of Victoria immediately offered the three ships for service in the Sudan. The offer was accepted, and Childers was sent ahead, arriving on 19 March at Suakin. By that time, the conflict had moved too far inland for warships to be of any assistance, and the vessels departed three days later. They arrived in Melbourne on 26 June after travelling via Aden, Colombo, the Dutch East Indies and Torres Strait.

Childers joined the Commonwealth Naval Forces following federation in 1901, and the Royal Australian Navy when it was formed in 1911. During World War I she served in Victorian waters and as a tender to HMAS Cerberus.

Decommissioning and fate
Childers was sold to J.J. Savage & Co. of South Yarra on 5 April 1918 for £20. Childers was eventually hulked on Swan Island in Port Phillip.

See also
List of Victorian Naval Forces ships
Colonial navies of Australia - Victoria
List of Royal Australian Navy ships

Citations

References

Torpedo boats of the Victorian Naval Forces
Torpedo boats of the Royal Australian Navy
1884 ships
Ships built in Chiswick
Ships built by John I. Thornycroft & Company